Empire (translit. Ampir; from ) is a short film directed by Alexander Sokurov, released in 1986. The movie is based on a play by Lucille Fletcher.

Background
Empire was inspired by Lucille Fletcher's radio drama Sorry, Wrong Number. For the film, Sokurov, as often, selected a single motif from the work of inspiration – in this case, it was the sickness of a woman.

It was produced as the graduation work of S. Sidorov from the VGIK. At that time Sokurov was not allowed to work on his own films, and saw this as an opportunity to continue work in the field.

References

External links

Sokurov's website

1986 films
Lenfilm films
Films directed by Alexander Sokurov
Soviet short films
1980s Russian-language films
1986 drama films